1-Docosanol, also known as behenyl alcohol, is a saturated fatty alcohol containing 22 carbon atoms, used traditionally as an emollient, emulsifier, and thickener in cosmetics.

In July 2000, docosanol was approved for medical use in the United States as an antiviral agent for reducing the duration of cold sores. It is an over-the-counter medication (OTC). It is sold under the brand name Abreva among others.

Side effects
One of the most common side effects that has been reported from docosanol is headache. Headaches caused by the medication tend to be mild and can occur in any region of the head. In clinical trials, headache occurred in 10.4% of people treated with docosanol cream and 10.7% of people treated with placebo.

The most serious side effects, although rare, are allergic reactions. Some of the patients experienced the symptoms of allergic reactions, including difficulty breathing, confusion, angioedema (facial swelling), fainting, dizziness, hives or chest pain.

Other side effects may include: acne, burning, dryness, itching, rash, redness, acute diarrhea, soreness, swelling.

Mechanism of action
Docosanol is thought to act by inhibiting the fusion of the human host cell with the viral envelope of the herpes virus, thus preventing its replication.

History
The drug was approved as a cream for oral herpes after clinical trials by the FDA in July 2000.
It was shown to shorten the healing by 17.5 hours on average (95% confidence interval: 2 to 22 hours) in a placebo-controlled trial. Another trial showed no effect when treating the infected backs of guinea pigs.

Two experiments with n-docosanol cream failed to show statistically significant differences by any parameter between n-docosanol cream and vehicle control–treated sites or between n-docosanol and untreated infection sites.

Society and culture

Controversy 
In March 2007, it was the subject of a US nationwide class-action suit against Avanir and GlaxoSmithKline as the claim that it cut recovery times in half was found to have been misleading in a California court, but the case was eventually settled and the "cuts healing time in half" claim had not been used in product advertising for some years.

References

External links 
 

Antiviral drugs
Fatty alcohols
Primary alcohols
GSK plc brands
Alkanols